Frederick Church may refer to:

 Frederic Edwin Church (1826–1900), American landscape painter from Connecticut
 Frederick Stuart Church (1842–1924), American painter from Michigan
 Fred Church (actor) (1889–1983), American actor
 Frederick Church (engineer) (1878–1936), early amusement park pioneer
 Frederic Cameron Church Jr., American businessman